The Winnipeg Jets are a Canadian professional ice hockey team based in Winnipeg, Manitoba. They play in the Central Division of the Western Conference in the National Hockey League (NHL).  The team joined the NHL in 1999 as an expansion team as the Atlanta Thrashers, but moved to Winnipeg, Manitoba in 2011, being renamed after the previous Winnipeg Jets team (now playing as the Arizona Coyotes). The Jets play their home games at the Canada Life Centre. They are owned by True North Sports & Entertainment, Kevin Cheveldayoff is their general manager, and Blake Wheeler is the team captain.

The team's first head coach was Claude Noel, who was previously the interim head coach of the Columbus Blue Jackets towards the end of the 2009–10 season. He was fired on January 12, 2014, and replaced by former Carolina Hurricanes and Toronto Maple Leafs head coach Paul Maurice.

Key

Coaches
Note: Statistics are correct as of the end of the 2021–22 season.

Notes
 A running total of the number of coaches of the Jets. Thus, any coach who has two or more separate terms as head coach is only counted once.
 Before the 2005–06 season, the NHL instituted a penalty shootout for regular season games that remained tied after a five-minute overtime period, which prevented ties.
Each year is linked to an article about that particular NHL season.

References

  
head coaches
Winnipeg Jets